Andrena praecox is a Palearctic species of mining bee.

References

External links
Images representing Andrena praecox

Hymenoptera of Europe
praecox
Insects described in 1763
Taxa named by Giovanni Antonio Scopoli